Dorothy Gordon may refer to:

 Dorothy Gordon (British actress) (born 1924-2013)
 Dorothy Gordon (Australian actress) (1891–1985), Australian actress, journalist, and radio broadcaster
 Dorothy Gordon (activist), Ghanaian technology activist and development specialist